Renata Voráčová and Barbora Záhlavová-Strýcová were the defending champions, having won the event in 2013, but both players chose not to participate.

Lucie Hradecká and Michaëlla Krajicek won the tournament, defeating Andrea Hlaváčková and Lucie Šafářová in the final, 6–3, 6–2.

Seeds

Draw

References 
 Draw

Sparta Prague Open - Doubles
WTA Prague Open